Fernando Roig Alfonso (born 25 June 1947) is a Spanish billionaire businessman, the owner and president of the Spanish football club Villarreal CF, and owner of 9% of the Spanish supermarket chain Mercadona. As of October 2021, Forbes estimated his net worth at US$1.7 billion.

His brother Juan Roig, is the CEO and majority shareholder, his wife Hortensia Herrero owns 28% of the Spanish supermarket chain Mercadona.

Roig is married, with two children, and lives in Valencia, Spain.

References

1947 births
Living people
Spanish billionaires
20th-century Spanish businesspeople
21st-century Spanish businesspeople